Morum janae is a species of sea snail, a marine gastropod mollusk, in the family Harpidae.

Description
The length of the shell attains 13.6 mm.

Distribution
This marine species occurs off the Tuamotu Archipelago.

References

 Monsecour D. & Lorenz F. (2011) A new species of Morum (Gastropoda: Harpidae) from the Tuamotu Archipelago. Schriften zur Malakozoologie 26: 3-6.

janae
Gastropods described in 2011